Les Pas perdus (English title: The Last Steps) is a 1964 French drama film directed by Jacques Robin who co-wrote screenplay with René Fallet, based on novel by René Fallet. The film stars Michèle Morgan and Jean-Louis Trintignant.

It tells the story of a rich attractive married woman who become involved in a love affair with a young worker she has met in the station.

Principal cast
Michèle Morgan -  Yolande Simonnet 
Jean-Louis Trintignant -  Georges Guichard 
Jean Carmet -  Déde Lemartin 
Michel Vitold -  Pierre Simonnet 
Catherine Rouvel -  Sonia, dite Mazurka

External links

French black-and-white films
Films based on French novels
1964 films
1960s French films